The Ambassador of the United Kingdom to Mexico is the United Kingdom's foremost diplomatic representative in the United Mexican States, and head of the UK's diplomatic mission in Mexico.

Besides the embassy in Mexico City, the UK also maintains a consulate general in Cancun.

Heads of mission

Envoy Extraordinary and Minister Plenipotentiary to the Republic of Mexico
1835–1843: Richard Pakenham, Minister Plenipotentiary
1843: Percy William Doyle, Chargé d'Affaires
1843–1847: Charles Bankhead, Minister Plenipotentiary
1847–1850: Percy William Doyle, Chargé d'Affaires
1850–1851: Charles Bankhead, Chargé d'Affaires
1851–1858: Percy William Doyle
1858–1860: Loftus Charles Otway
1860–1864: Charles Lennox Wyke

Envoy Extraordinary and Minister Plenipotentiary to the Emperor of Mexico
1864–1867: Peter Campbell Scarlett

Envoy Extraordinary and Minister Plenipotentiary to the United States of Mexico
1867–1884: No diplomatic relations following French intervention in Mexico
1884–1893: Sir Spenser St. John previously on special mission there
1893–1894: Hon. Power Henry Le Poer Trench
1894–1900: Sir Henry Dering
1900–1906: George Greville
1906–1911: Reginald Tower
1911–1913: Sir Francis Stronge
1913–1914: Sir Lionel Carden
1914–1925: Diplomatic relations broken during Mexican Revolution
1925–1929: Sir Esmond Ovey
1929–1934: Edmund Monson
1935–1937: John Murray
1937–1938: Owen O'Malley
1938–1941: Diplomatic relations broken due to Mexican oil expropriation
1941–1944: Charles Bateman

Ambassador Extraordinary and Plenipotentiary
1944–1947: Charles Bateman
1947–1950: Sir Thomas Rapp
1950–1954: Sir John Taylor
1954–1956: Sir William Sullivan
1956–1960: Sir Andrew Noble
1960–1964: Sir Peter Garran
1964–1968: Sir Nicolas Cheetham
1968–1972: Sir Peter Hope
1972–1977: Sir John Galsworthy
1977–1981: Norman Ernest Cox
1981–1983: Sir Crispin Tickell
1983–1986: Sir Kenneth James
1986–1989: Sir John Morgan
1989–1992: Sir Michael Simpson-Orlebar
1992–1994: Sir Roger Hervey
1994–1998: Sir Adrian Beamish
1999–2002: Adrian Thorpe
2002–2005: Denise Holt
2005–2009: Giles Paxman
2009–2013: Judith Macgregor
2013–2018: Duncan Taylor

2018–: Corin Robertson
2021–present: Jon Benjamin

References

External links
Mexico and the UK, gov.uk

Mexico
 
United Kingdom